Elections to Wiltshire County Council were held on 2 May 1985.  The whole council of seventy-five members was up for election and the result was that the Conservatives lost their majority, winning only thirty seats, resulting in no overall control. The Liberals gained seats, winning seventeen, the Social Democrats won eight seats, the first time they had been represented in the council, while Labour had losses, finishing like the Liberals with seventeen members. Three Independents, including one Ratepayer, were also elected.
 
In an editorial on 4 May headed "Local Lessons", The Times commented that "The Conservatives predominate as the single largest party in the counties still. Generalizations from such elections are always flawed by local factors. Intra-party disputes help explain the loss of Conservative seats in Wiltshire". 

Following the elections, an informal agreement between the leader of the Liberal group, Jack Ainslie, and the leader of the Labour members, Mary Salisbury, led to the formation of a minority SDP–Liberal Alliance administration. Salisbury commented to The Times "Where the Liberals put forward what seem to be measures which are beneficial to the people of Wiltshire, we will support them."

Election result

|}

Results by divisions

Aldbourne and Ramsbury

Alderbury

Amesbury

Bedwyn

Blunsdon

Box

Bradford on Avon North

Bradford on Avon South

Bremhill and Calne Without

Brinkworth

Calne

Chippenham Park

Chippenham Sheldon

Chippenham Town

Collingbourne

Corsham

Cricklade

Devizes

Devizes South and Cannings

Downton

Durrington

Highworth

Holt

Idmiston

Kington

Laverstock

Lavington

Malmesbury

Marlborough

Melksham

Melksham Without

Mere

References

External links
Colin Rallings, Michael Thrasher, Wiltshire County Council election Results 1973–2005 at electionscentre.co.uk

1985
1985 English local elections
20th century in Wiltshire